Crazy People is a 1990 comedy film starring Dudley Moore and Daryl Hannah.

Crazy People may also refer to:

Crazy People (1934 film), a British comedy film
Crazy People (Herreys album), 1985
Crazy People (The Rowan Brothers album), 2002
Crazy People, later The Goon Show, a BBC radio series